Jianxing Township is a township in Xinping Yi and Dai Autonomous County, Yunnan province, China. , it has one residential community and 6 villages under its administration.

See also 
 List of township-level divisions of Yunnan

References 

Township-level divisions of Yuxi
Xinping Yi and Dai Autonomous County